Destroy the Opposition is the third album by American death metal band Dying Fetus. It was produced by the band and Steve Carr. The album marks a change in Dying Fetus's direction, with political themes becoming dominant, which has continued in all of their subsequent albums.

Albert Mudrian, in his 2004 book Choosing Death,  cited Destroy the Opposition as one of the most important albums released in 2000.  The album was also included in Decibel's Top 100 Albums of the decade list for the 2000s (Decibel Magazine Special Edition, December 2009), as well as to Decibel's "Hall of Fame" (#89, July 2012).

The album was released in the same year in which Dying Fetus formed Blunt Force Records.

Track listing

Personnel
John Gallagher – guitars, vocals
Jason Netherton – bass guitar, vocals
Sparky Voyles – guitars
Kevin Talley – drums

References 

Dying Fetus albums
2000 albums
Relapse Records albums
Good Life Recordings albums